Sweet 18 (lit. "18-year-old Bride") is a South Korean television series that aired on KBS2 in 2004. The story strongly focuses on both personal and clan-level relationships between Jung-sook, a member of Papyeong's Yun clan, and Hyuk-joon, a member of Andong's Kwon clan. Both clans had hoped for re-establishing good relations after being separated for three generations by war, by arranging a marriage between Jung-sook and Hyuk-joon upon Jung-sook's birth.

Plot
Yoon Jung-sook (Han Ji-hye) is an eighteen-year-old, dreamy, lively school girl. One day, she encounters a mysterious man in traditional Korean clothing on the streets who carries a piece of literature her quite famous grandfather treasured. Despite not seeing his face, she falls head-over-heels in love with him and vows to marry him. Since she is the member of an ancient and noble Korean Clan, the Yun clan, she will marry Kwon Hyuk-joon (Lee Dong-gun), the heir of the Kwon clan. Hyuk-joon is ten years older than Jung-sook and already a prosecutor. Jung-sook finds out that Hyuk-joon is the mysterious man whom she fell in love with and willingly marries him. She becomes a housewife while her friends continue to attend college. Two worlds clash, as Jung-sook is still an immature teenager and Hyuk-joon a grown man. However, slowly, they become attracted to each other and fall in love, despite the fact that Jung-sook is pursued by a school mate and Hyuk-joon meets his first love again, who wants him back. Jung-sook has much to learn about the ancient traditions of the family of her husband and what it means to be married to a first-born son, however in the end, they are deeply in love with each other. Jung-sook gives birth to twins and starts a sewing business. Hyuk-joon continues working as a prosecutor in the police force in Seoul.

Cast
 Han Ji-hye as Yoon Jung-sook
 Lee Dong-gun as Kwon Hyuk-joon
 Lee Da-hae as Moon Ga-young
 Lee In as Ji Nam-cheol
 Yoo Hye-jung as Kwon Sun-ah
 Park Joon-hyuk as Jung Chan
 Lee Soon-jae as Hyuk-joon's grandfather
 Kim Hae-sook as Jung-sook's mother
 Jung Kyung-ho as Jung-sook's blind date
 Lee Eun-joo as Seo Hyun-ju (Second Princess)
 Lee Eun-shil as Eun-ju (Third Princess)
 Kim Sun-hwa as Madam Kim
 Jo Yeon-hee as Hyuk-jun's college junior
 Ko Kyu-pil as Hyuk-joon's co-worker
 Park Ji-il as Hyuk-joon's uncle

Notes

References

External links
 Sweet 18 official KBS website 
 
 

Korean Broadcasting System television dramas
2004 South Korean television series debuts
2004 South Korean television series endings
Korean-language television shows
South Korean romantic comedy television series